Billie Jo is a studio album by American country artist, Billie Jo Spears. It was released in October 1975 via United Artists Records and contained ten tracks. A mixture of new recordings and cover tunes were featured on the disc. Among them were the singles, "Stay Away from the Apple Tree" and "Silver Wings and Golden Rings". Both singles reached the top 20 of the North American country charts in 1975. The album itself reached the top 50 of the American country albums chart. It was the eighth studio album of Spears's career and her second with the United Artists label.

Background and recording
In 1975, Billie Jo Spears had a comeback with the number one country single "Blanket on the Ground". The song set forth a series of singles and albums that were issued by United Artists Records during the seventies decade. Billie Jo was the first studio album that immediately followed "Blanket on the Ground" and its subsequent album. The project was recorded at the Jack Clement Recording Studio in Nashville, Tennessee. It was produced by Larry Butler in July 1975.

Content
Billie Jo consisted of ten tracks. It mixed both original recordings with covers of previously-recorded material. Several of the new tracks featured writing credits from producer Larry Butler. This included "Stay Away from the Apple Tree" and Spears's cover of "(Hey Won't You Play) Another Somebody Done Somebody Wrong Song". Other new songs included "We Love Each Other", "Enough for You" and "But I Do". Also included is the song "Every Time Two Fools Collide", which was first cut by Spears for this project. In 1978, it would be recorded as a duet by Kenny Rogers and Dottie West. Their version would top the Billboard country chart. Other covers included the American pop single "Hurt" and Tanya Tucker's number one Billboard country single "Lizzie and the Rainman".

Release, reception, chart performance and singles

Billie Jo was released by United Artists Records in October 1975. It was Spears's second studio album with United Artists and her eighth studio album overall. The label originally distributed it as a vinyl LP, with five songs on each side of the disc. The album was met with mixed reviews. James Chrispell of AllMusic gave Billie Jo four out of five stars and called it "another fine effort". Alan Cackett of Country Music People magazine called it "a disappointment". Cackett further commented, "As a country album, indeed, it rates pretty average. Billie Jo sounds very disenchanted with life if the content of these songs is anything to go by." Billie Jo entered the American Billboard Top Country Albums chart in November 1975. After seven weeks, it only reached number 45 on the chart. 

Two singles were included on the disc. The first single released was "Stay Away from the Apple Tree", which United Artists first issued in May 1975. It reached number 20 on the Billboard Hot Country Songs chart by the time its corresponding album was issued in October 1975. On the Canadian RPM Country Tracks survey, it reached the number 17 position. "Silver Wings and Golden Rings" was then spawned from the album as a single in September 1975. It also reached the number 20 position on the Billboard country chart, peaking at the position in January 1976. On the RPM Country Tracks chart, it climber to number 12.

Track listing

Personnel
All credits are adapted from the liner notes of Billie Jo.

Musical personnel
Bob Moore, Henry Strzelecki – bass guitar
Hargus "Pig" Robbins, George Richey, Bobby Wood – piano
Karl Himmel, Jerry Carrigan, Kenny Malone – drums
Billy Sanford, Grady Martin, Reggie Young – lead guitar
Kelso Herston, Pete Wade, Billy Sanford, Reggie Young – rhythm guitar
Tommy Allsup – bass
Pete Drake – steel guitar
Charles "Chuck" Cochran – Moog synthesizer
The Jordanaires – backing vocals

Technical personnel
Produced by Larry Butler
Recorded at Jack Clement Recording Studio, Nashville, Tennessee
Strings Arranged by Bill Justis
Sound Engineers – Garth Fundis (Tracks 2–10) & Billy Sherrill (Track 1)
Album photograph – Walden S. Fabry
Album design – Bob Cato

Chart performance

Release history

References

1975 albums
Albums arranged by Bill Justis
Albums produced by Larry Butler (producer)
Billie Jo Spears albums
United Artists Records albums